was a Japanese politician who served as the Prime Minister of Japan from 1996 to 1998. He was the leader of one of the largest factions within the ruling LDP through most of the 1990s and remained a powerful back-room player in Japanese politics until scandal forced him to resign his leadership position in 2004. Disgraced, he chose not to stand in the general election of 2005, and effectively retired from politics. He died on 1 July 2006 at a Tokyo hospital.

Early political life

Hashimoto was born on 29 July 1937, in Sōja in Okayama Prefecture. His father, Ryōgo Hashimoto, was a cabinet minister under Prime Minister Nobusuke Kishi. Following his father's lead, Ryutaro received his degree in political science from Keio University in 1960, and was elected to the House of Representatives of Japan in 1963.

He moved through the ranks of the Liberal Democratic Party over the next twenty years, landing a spot as Minister of Health and Welfare under premier Masayoshi Ōhira in 1978, and in 1980 became the LDP's director of finance and public administration. He again became a cabinet minister in 1986 under Yasuhiro Nakasone, and in 1989 became secretary general of the LDP, the highest rank short of party president (if the LDP is in government, usually also the prime minister.)

Hashimoto became a key figure in the strong LDP faction founded by Kakuei Tanaka in the 1970s, which later fell into the hands of Noboru Takeshita, who then was tainted by the Recruit scandal of 1988. In 1991, the press had discovered that one of Hashimoto's secretaries had been involved in an illegal financial dealing. Hashimoto retired as Minister of Finance from the Second Kaifu Cabinet. Following the collapse of the bubble economy, the LDP momentarily lost power in 1993/94 during the Hosokawa and Hata anti-LDP coalition cabinets negotiated by LDP defector Ichirō Ozawa. Hashimoto was brought back to the cabinet when the LDP under Yōhei Kōno returned to power in 1994 by entering a ruling coalition with traditional archrival Japanese Socialist Party (JSP), giving the prime ministership to the junior partner, and the minor New Party Harbinger (NPH). Hashimoto became Minister of International Trade and Industry in the Murayama Cabinet of Tomiichi Murayama. As the chief of MITI, Hashimoto made himself known at meetings of APEC and at summit conferences.

In September 1995, Yōhei Kōno did not stand for another term. Hashimoto won the election to LDP president against Jun'ichirō Koizumi 304 votes to 87, and succeeded Kōno as leader of the party and as deputy prime minister in the Murayama cabinet.

Prime minister

When Murayama stepped down in 1996, the 135th National Diet elected Hashimoto to become Japan's 82nd prime minister – he was elected against NFP leader Ichirō Ozawa with 288 votes to 167 in the lower house and 158 to 69 in the upper house – and lead the continued LDP-JSP-NPH coalition government (First Hashimoto Cabinet).

Hashimoto reached an agreement with the United States for the repatriation of MCAS Futenma, a controversial U.S. military base in an urban area of Okinawa, in April 1996. The deal was opposed by Japan's foreign ministry and defense agency but was backed by Hashimoto's American counterpart, President Bill Clinton. The repatriation of the base has yet to be completed as of 2015, as Okinawans have opposed efforts to relocate the base to a new site. Hashimoto's domestic popularity increased during the Japanese-US trade dispute when he publicly confronted Mickey Kantor, US Trade Representative for the Clinton administration.

Hashimoto's popularity was largely based on his attitude. When asked about why Japanese car dealerships did not sell American cars, he answered, "Why doesn't IBM sell Fujitsu computers?" When Japan's economy did not seem to be recovering from its 1991 collapse, Hashimoto ordered a commission of experts from the private sector to look into improving the Japanese market for foreign competition, and eventually opening it completely.

On 27 September 1996, the Hashimoto cabinet dissolved the lower house of the National Diet. In the ensuing general lower house election in October, the LDP made gains while its coalition partners SDP – the JSP had been renamed briefly after the formation of the Hashimoto cabinet – and NPH lost seats. Both parties ended the coalition with the LDP, but they remained Diet allies in a cooperation outside the cabinet (kakugai kyōryoku) until 1998. Thus, the LDP and the Second Hashimoto Cabinet safely controlled both houses of the Diet, although it was initially technically in the minority by a few seats in the lower house, and well short of a majority in the upper house. It was the first single-party LDP government since 1993. Having achieved this, Hashimoto was confirmed without challenger as party president in September 1997.

Hashimoto's government raised the Japanese consumption tax in 1997. Although the government implemented a reduction in the personal income tax prior to raising the consumption tax, the hike still had a negative effect on consumer demand in Japan.

During the Upper House regular election 1998, the LDP failed to restore its majority (lost in 1989 and not to be regained until 2016) and instead lost more seats. Hashimoto resigned to take responsibility for this failure, and was succeeded as LDP president and Prime Minister by Foreign Minister Keizō Obuchi.

Later political life

Hashimoto stayed in a LDP adviser party, and in the 2nd Mori Cabinet the Minister of Okinawa Development Agency and Minister in charge of administrative reform were appointed. He led the faction for several years. In 2001 he was one of the leading candidates to take office as prime minister but lost in the election of the more popular Prime Minister Junichiro Koizumi.

Hashimoto's faction began to collapse late in 2003 while debating over whether to re-elect Koizumi. In December 2004, Hashimoto stepped down as faction leader when he was found to have accepted a ¥100 million cheque from the Japan Dental Association, and announced that he would not run for re-election in his lower house district.

On World Water Day (22 March) in 2004, United Nations Secretary-General Kofi Annan established a global advisory board on Water and Sanitation, and appointed Ryutaro Hashimoto as its chairman. Just prior to his death, Hashimoto submitted a letter addressed to "The People of the World" for publication in the book Water Voices from Around The World (October 2007), which is a book affiliated with the United Nations' decade of water (2005–15). In his letter, he addressed water-related disasters around the world, with an urgent appeal to the United Nations to halve the number of deaths caused by water disasters by 2015. Hashimoto closes this letter by writing: "An old proverb says 'Dripping water wears away the stone.' I humbly suggest, that through steadfast efforts, we can overcome any obstacle our civilization may encounter in the coming decade."

Family
He was married to Kumiko Hashimoto (橋本 久美子 Hashimoto Kumiko).

Former governor of Kōchi Prefecture, Daijiro Hashimoto, is his half-brother.

House of Representatives member and member of the Liberal Democratic Party Gaku Hashimoto is his second son.

Honours

 Grand Cordon of the Order of the Chrysanthemum (1 July 2006; posthumous)
Senior Second Rank (1 July 2006; posthumous)
Golden Pheasant Award of the Scout Association of Japan (1992)

Personal life
Hashimoto achieved the level of sixth degree black belt (6th dan) in Kendo, the art of Japanese fencing. In 1998, Hashimoto donated two tournament trophies to the Harvard Invitational Shoryuhai Intercollegiate Kendo Tournament as tokens of his encouragement.

An exchange program between the Scout Association of Japan and the Boy Scouts of America was started in 1998, at the suggestion of then-Prime Minister Hashimoto in a 1996 meeting with U.S. President Bill Clinton. In 1998, he was presented with the Silver World Award by Jere Ratcliffe, Chief Scout Executive of the Boy Scouts of America, "for outstanding contributions to young people on an international level".

In 1999, Hashimoto appeared as a judge on the Japanese television show Iron Chef for the show's final battle, between Hiroyuki Sakai and Alain Passard.

References

Further reading
 Fredriksen, John C. ed. Biographical Dictionary of Modern World Leaders (2003) pp 196–198.
 Mishima, Ko. "The Changing Relationship between Japan's LDP and the Bureaucracy: Hashimoto's Administrative Reform Effort and Its Politics." Asian Survey 38 (October 1998): 968–989.
 Taichi, Sakaiya. "Hashimoto Reform Has a Particular Ability to save Japan." Japan Echo Web 10 (Feb 2012) online.
 Weathers, Charles. "Reformer or Destroyer? Hashimoto Tōru and Populist Neoliberal Politics in Japan." Social Science Japan Journal 17.1 (2014): 77-96 online.
 Zagorsky, Alexei V. "Three years on a path to nowhere: The Hashimoto initiative in Russian-Japanese relations." Pacific Affairs (2001): 75-93 online.

External links
 Ryutaro Hashimoto Dies at 68; a Tough Former Prime Minister of Japan; New York Times obituary.
 Major Speech and Articles Prime Minister Ryutaro Hashimoto - Government of Japan
 Junichiro Koizumi. Memorial Address at the Joint Memorial Service by the Cabinet and Liberal Democratic Party for the Late Ryutaro Hashimoto (8 August 2006.) ; retrieved 9 February 2007.

|-

|-

|-

|-

|-

|-

|-

|-

|-

|-

 

1937 births
2006 deaths
20th-century prime ministers of Japan
Keio University alumni
Liberal Democratic Party (Japan) politicians
Members of the House of Representatives (Japan)
Deputy Prime Ministers of Japan
Ministers of Finance of Japan
Ministers of Transport of Japan
Prime Ministers of Japan
20th-century Japanese politicians
21st-century Japanese politicians
Politicians from Okayama Prefecture